Peg Higgins (born  1949) is a former member of the New Hampshire House of Representatives politician.

Early life
Higgins was born around 1949. Higgins earned a master's in education from the University of New Hampshire.

Career
Higgins used to work as a teacher in the Rochester School District. On November 6, 2018, Higgins was elected to the New Hampshire House of Representatives where she represents the Strafford 22 district. She assumed office on December 5, 2018. She is a Democrat. On November 3, 2020, Higgins was defeated in her bid for re-election by her predecessor, Thomas Kaczynski Jr., and left office on December 1, 2020.

Personal life
Higgins resides in Rochester, New Hampshire. Higgins is married and has two children.

References

Living people
1940s births
People from Rochester, New Hampshire
Women state legislators in New Hampshire
Democratic Party members of the New Hampshire House of Representatives
University of New Hampshire alumni
21st-century American politicians
21st-century American women politicians
Year of birth missing (living people)